Željko Jerkov (born 6 November 1953, in Pula) is a former Croatian professional basketball player. At a height of 2.08 m (6'10") tall, and a weight of 95 kg (210 lbs.), he played at the center position.

Professional career
Jerkov was a member of the FIBA European Selection, in 1976, 1978, and 1982.

Yugoslav national team
Jerkov competed with the senior Yugoslav national basketball team at the 1976 Summer Olympics, where he won a silver medal, and at the 1980 Summer Olympics, where he won a gold medal.

Awards and accomplishments

Clubs
2× Yugoslav Cup Winner: (1974, 1977)
2× FIBA Korać Cup Champion: (1976, 1977)
3× FIBA European Selection: (1976, 1978, 1982)
Yugoslav League Champion: (1977)
FIBA Saporta Cup Champion: (1983)

References

External links
FIBA Profile
FIBA Europe Profile
Italian League Profile 

1953 births
Living people
Croatian men's basketball players
Basketball players at the 1976 Summer Olympics
Basketball players at the 1980 Summer Olympics
KK Split players
Lega Basket Serie A players
Olympic basketball players of Yugoslavia
Olympic gold medalists for Yugoslavia
Olympic medalists in basketball
Olympic silver medalists for Yugoslavia
Pallacanestro Treviso players
Sportspeople from Pula
Victoria Libertas Pallacanestro players
Yugoslav men's basketball players
1974 FIBA World Championship players
1978 FIBA World Championship players
1982 FIBA World Championship players
Medalists at the 1980 Summer Olympics
Medalists at the 1976 Summer Olympics
Centers (basketball)
FIBA World Championship-winning players
Mediterranean Games gold medalists for Yugoslavia
Mediterranean Games medalists in basketball
Competitors at the 1975 Mediterranean Games